The 1997 Pacific hurricane season was the most active season since the 1994 season, producing 24 tropical depressions, 19 of which became tropical storms or hurricanes. The season officially started on May 15, 1997 in the Eastern Pacific—designated as the area east of 140°W—and on June 1, 1997 in the Central Pacific, which is between the International Date Line and 140°W. The season officially ended in both basins on November 30, 1997. These dates typically limit the period of each year when most tropical cyclones form in the eastern Pacific basin. This timeline documents all the storm formations, strengthening, weakening, landfalls, extratropical transitions, as well as dissipation. The timeline also includes information which was not operationally released, meaning that information from post-storm reviews by the National Hurricane Center, such as information on a storm that was not operationally warned on, has been included.

The first storm formed on June 1 and the final storm crossed into the western Pacific on December 6, thus ending the season. There were 24 cyclones in both the eastern and central Pacific, including 5 unnamed tropical depressions. Of these, 19 were in the east Pacific; 8 peaked at tropical storm intensity, while 10 reached hurricane status. Seven of these reached Category 3 intensity or higher on the Saffir–Simpson Hurricane Scale, including central Pacific cyclones Super Typhoons Oliwa and Paka, which became typhoons after crossing into the Western Pacific.

Activity in the Central Pacific was above average; two tropical storms formed in addition to several tropical depressions. Some of the storms entered the region from the east. The 1997 season was the fourth-most active in the Central Pacific since satellite observations began. Nine tropical cyclones entered or formed in the region during that period.

Timeline of storms

May

May 15
 The Eastern Pacific hurricane season officially begins.

June

June 1
 The Central Pacific hurricane season officially begins.
0000 UTC – Tropical Depression One-E forms 300 miles (555 km) south of the Gulf of Tehuantepec.

June 2
1200 UTC – Tropical Depression One-E strengthens into Tropical Storm Andres.

June 6
0600 UTC – Tropical Storm Andres weakens into a tropical depression.

June 7
0100 UTC – Tropical Depression Andres makes landfall near San Salvador, El Salvador with wind of 30 mph (50 km/h).
0600 UTC – The surface circulation of Tropical Depression Andres rapidly dissipates over the mountains of Central America.

June 9
1800 UTC – Tropical Depression Two-E forms in the Gulf of Tehuantepec.

June 10
0000 UTC – Tropical Depression Two-E strengthens into Tropical Storm Blanca.

June 12
0000 UTC – Tropical Storm Blanca weakens into a tropical depression.
1200 UTC – Tropical Depression Blanca loses its surface circulation.

June 21
1800 UTC – Tropical Depression Three-E forms.

June 24
0000 UTC – Tropical Depression Three-E dissipates.

June 25
0600 UTC – Tropical Depression Four-E forms 450 miles (830 km) southeast of the southern tip of the Baja Peninsula.
1800 UTC – Tropical Depression Four-E strengthens into Tropical Storm Carlos.

June 27
0600 UTC – Tropical Storm Carlos weakens into Tropical Depression Carlos.

June 28
0600 UTC – Tropical Depression Carlos dissipates.

June 29
1200 UTC – Tropical Depression Five-E forms.

July

July 4
0600 UTC – Tropical Depression Five-E dissipates.

July 5
1200 UTC – It is estimated that Tropical Depression Six-E forms 600 miles (1110 km) southeast of the southern tip of the Baja Peninsula it is operationally upgraded to Tropical Storm Dolores.

July 6
0000 UTC – Tropical Depression Six-E strengthens into Tropical Storm Dolores.

July 7
1200 UTC – Tropical Storm Dolores strengthens into the first hurricane of the season.

July 10
0600 UTC – Hurricane Dolores weakens into Tropical Storm Dolores.

July 11
0600 UTC – Tropical Storm Dolores weakens into a tropical depression.

July 12
0600 UTC – Tropical Depression Seven-E forms 850 miles (1575 km) south-southwest of the southern tip of the Baja Peninsula.
1800 UTC – Tropical Depression Seven-E strengthens into Tropical Storm Enrique.
1800 UTC – Tropical Depression Dolores dissipates.

July 13
1200 UTC – Tropical Storm Enrique strengthens into the second hurricane of the season.

July 14
0000 UTC – Hurricane Enrique strengthens into a Category 2 hurricane.
1200 UTC – Tropical Depression Eight-E forms several hundred miles south of Manzanillo, Mexico.
1800 UTC – Hurricane Enrique strengthens into the first major hurricane (a hurricane with winds more than 111 mph (180 km/h) of the season.

July 15
0000 UTC – Hurricane Enrique weakens into a Category 2 hurricane.
0600 UTC – Hurricane Enrique weakens into a Category 1 hurricane.
1800 UTC – Tropical Depression Eight-E strengthens into Tropical Storm Felicia.
1800 UTC – Hurricane Enrique weakens into a tropical storm.

July 16
1200 UTC – Tropical Storm Enrique weakens into a tropical depression.
1800 UTC – Tropical Depression Enrique begins to dissipate and the last advisory is issued.
1800 UTC – Hurricane Enrique weakens into a tropical storm.

July 17
0600 UTC – Tropical Storm Felicia strengthens into the third hurricane of the season.

July 18
1200 UTC – Hurricane Felicia strengthens into a Category 2 hurricane.
1800 UTC – Hurricane Felicia strengthens into the second major hurricane of the season.

July 19
0600 UTC – Hurricane Felicia strengthens into a Category 4 hurricane.

July 20
0000 UTC – Hurricane Felicia weakens into a Category 3 hurricane.
1800 UTC – Hurricane Felicia weakens into a Category 2 hurricane.

July 21
0600 UTC – Hurricane Felicia weakens into a Category 1 hurricane.
1200 UTC – Hurricane Felicia weakens into a tropical storm.

July 22
0600 UTC – Tropical Storm Felicia weakens into a tropical depression.
1200 UTC – Tropical Depression Felicia dissipates.

July 27
0000 UTC – Tropical Depression One-C forms southwest of the Hawaiian Islands.
1800 UTC – Tropical Depression One-C dissipates.

July 30
1200 UTC – Tropical Depression Nine-E forms 300 miles (555 km) south of Salina Cruz, Mexico.

July 31
0600 UTC – Tropical Depression Nine-E strengthens into Tropical Storm Guillermo.

August

August 1
1800 UTC – Tropical Storm Guillermo strengthens into the fourth hurricane of the season.

August 2
1200 UTC – Hurricane Guillermo strengthens into a Category 2 hurricane.
1800 UTC – Hurricane Guillermo strengthens into the third major hurricane of the season.

August 3
0000 UTC – Hurricane Guillermo strengthens into a Category 4 hurricane.

August 4
1800 UTC – Hurricane Guillermo strengthens into the first Category 5 hurricane of the season.

August 5
1800 UTC – Hurricane Guillermo weakens into a Category 4 hurricane.

August 6
1800 UTC – Hurricane Guillermo weakens into a Category 3 hurricane

August 7
0600 UTC –  Hurricane Guillermo weakens into a Category 2 hurricane.
1200 UTC – Hurricane Guillermo weakens into a Category 1 hurricane.
August 8
0600 UTC – Hurricane Guillermo weakens into a tropical storm.

August 10
0000 UTC – Tropical Depression Ten-E forms 920 miles (1700 km) south-southwest of the southern tip of the Baja Peninsula.
1800 UTC – Tropical Storm Guillermo weakens into a tropical depression.

August 11
1800 UTC – Tropical Depression Guillermo re-strengthens into a tropical storm.
1800 UTC – Tropical Depression Ten-E strengthens into Tropical Storm Hilda.

August 14
0600 UTC – Tropical Storm Hilda weakens into a tropical depression.

August 15
0600 UTC – Tropical Depression Hilda dissipates.
1200 UTC – Tropical Storm Guillermo again weakens into a tropical depression.

August 16
0000 UTC – Tropical Depression Guillermo becomes extratropical.

August 17
0000 UTC – Tropical Depression Eleven-E forms 450 miles (830 km) southwest of Cabo San Lucas, Mexico.
1200  UTC – Tropical Depression Eleven-E strengthens into Tropical Storm Ignacio.

August 18
0600 UTC – Tropical Storm Ignacio weakens into Tropical Depression Ignacio.

August 19
1200 UTC – Tropical Depression Ignacio becomes extratropical.

August 25
1200 UTC – Tropical Depression Twelve-E forms.

August 26
0000 UTC – Tropical Depression Twelve-E strengthens into Tropical Storm Jimena.

August 27
0000 UTC – Tropical Storm Jimena strengthens into the fifth hurricane of the season.
0600 UTC – Hurricane Jimena explosively strengthens into the fourth major hurricane of the season.
1200 UTC – Hurricane Jimena strengthens into a Category 4 hurricane.

August 29
0000 UTC – Hurricane Jimena weakens into a Category 3 hurricane.
0600 UTC – Hurricane Jimena rapidly falls apart as it weakens from a Category 3 hurricane to a tropical storm.
1800 UTC – Tropical Storm Jimena weakens into a tropical depression.

August 30
0000 UTC – Tropical Depression Jimena dissipates.

September

September 2
1800 UTC – Tropical Depression Two-C forms near the International Dateline.

September 3
0000 UTC – Tropical Depression Two-C strengthens into Tropical Storm Oliwa—the Hawaiian name for Oliver.
1800 UTC – Tropical Depression Thirteen-E forms 325 miles (600 km) south-southwest of the southern tip of the Baja Peninsula.

September 4
0000 UTC – Tropical Storm Oliwa moves past 180°W into the West Pacific and the last advisory is issued by the Central Pacific Hurricane Center.
0600 UTC – Tropical Depression Thirteen-E strengthens into Tropical Storm Kevin.

September 6
0600 UTC – Tropical Storm Kevin weakens into a tropical depression.

September 7
0600 UTC – Tropical Depression Kevin dissipates.
September 9
1200 UTC – Tropical Depression Fourteen-E forms 400 miles (740 km) south of Manzanillo, Mexico.

September 10
0000 UTC – Tropical Depression Fourteen-E strengthens into Tropical Storm Linda.

September 11
0000 UTC – Tropical Storm Linda strengthens into the fifth hurricane of the season.
1200 UTC – Hurricane  Linda strengthens into the fourth major hurricane of the season, skipping Category 2 hurricane status.
1800 UTC – Hurricane Linda strengthens into a Category 4 hurricane.

September 12
0000 UTC – Hurricane Linda strengthens into the second, and final Category 5 hurricane of the season.
0600 UTC – Hurricane Linda's pressure drops to 902 mbar (hPa) or 26.64 in and 185 mph (300 km/h) making it the strongest storm in the Northeast Pacific ocean on record.
1800 UTC – Tropical Depression Fifteen-E forms 1300 miles (2400 km) east-southeast of the Hawaiian Islands.

September 13
1800 UTC – Hurricane Linda weakens into a Category 4 hurricane.

September 14
0000 UTC – Tropical Depression Fifteen-E strengthens into Tropical Storm Marty.
0600 UTC – Hurricane Linda weakens into a Category 3 hurricane.
1200 UTC – Hurricane Linda weakens into a Category 2 hurricane.
1800 UTC – Hurricane Linda weakens into a Category 1 hurricane.

September 15
1200 UTC – Hurricane Linda weakens into a tropical storm.
1200 UTC – Tropical Storm Marty weakens into a tropical depression.

September 16
0600 UTC – Tropical Depression Sixteen-E forms.
1800 UTC – Tropical Depression Sixteen-E strengthens into Tropical Storm Nora.
1800 UTC – Tropical Depression Marty dissipates.

September 17
0600 UTC – Tropical Storm Linda weakens into a tropical depression.

September 18
0000 UTC – Tropical Depression Linda dissipates.
1200 UTC – Tropical Storm Nora strengthens into the seventh hurricane of the season.
1800 UTC – Hurricane Nora strengthens into a Category 2 hurricane.

September 19
1200 UTC – Hurricane Nora weakens into a Category 1 hurricane.

September 21
0600 UTC – Hurricane Nora re-strengthens into a Category 2 hurricane.
1200 UTC – Hurricane Nora rapidly strengthens into a Category 4 hurricane and the sixth major hurricane of the season.
1800 UTC – Hurricane Nora weakens into a Category 3 hurricane.

September 23
0000 UTC – Hurricane Nora weakens into a Category 2 hurricane.
1200 UTC – Hurricane Nora weakens into a Category 1 hurricane.

September 25
0630 UTC – Hurricane Nora makes landfall near Punta Eugenia, Mexico on the Baja Peninsula with winds of 85 mph (135 km/h).
1100 UTC – Hurricane Nora makes its final landfall near San Fernando, Mexico with winds of 80 mph (130 km/h).
1800 UTC – Hurricane Nora weakens into a tropical storm.

September 26
0000 UTC – Tropical Storm Nora rapidly dissipates into a tropical depression.
0600 UTC – The final advisory for dissipating Tropical Depression Nora is issued.
1200 UTC – Tropical Depression Seventeen-E forms 300 miles (555 km) south of the Gulf of Tehuantepec.
1800 UTC – Tropical Depression Seventeen-E strengthens into Tropical Storm Olaf.

September 29
0000 UTC – Tropical Storm Olaf weakens into a tropical depression and makes landfall near Salina Cruz, Mexico with winds of 35 mph (55 km/h).

October

October 5
1200 UTC – Tropical Depression Eighteen-E forms 200 miles (370 km) south of Puerto Angel, Mexico.

October 6
0600 UTC – Tropical Depression Eighteen-E strengthens into Tropical Storm Pauline.
1200 UTC – Tropical Depression Three-C forms southeast of the Hawaiian Islands.

October 7
0000 UTC – Tropical Storm Pauline strengthens into the eighth hurricane of the season.
0600 UTC – Hurricane Pauline strengthens into the seventh and final major hurricane of the season.
1200 UTC – Hurricane Pauline strengthens into a Category 4 hurricane.
1200 UTC – Tropical Depression Three-C dissipates.
1800 UTC – Hurricane Pauline weakens into a Category 3 hurricane.

October 8
1800 UTC – Hurricane Pauline regains Category 4 hurricane status.

October 9
0000 UTC- Hurricane Pauline abruptly weakens and makes landfall in Mexico with winds of 110 mph (175 km/h).
0600 UTC – Hurricane Pauline weakens into a Category 1 hurricane.
1200 UTC – Hurricane Pauline weakens into a tropical storm.

October 10
0600 UTC – Tropical Storm Pauline weakens into a tropical depression.
1200 UTC – Tropical Depression Pauline dissipates.

October 12
1800 UTC – Tropical Depression Olaf makes landfall near Manzanillo, Mexico with winds of 30 mph (50 km/h) and dissipates.

October 31
0600 UTC – Tropical Depression Four-C forms southeast of the Hawaiian Islands.

November

November 1
0600 UTC – Tropical Depression Four-C dissipates.

November 7
0000 UTC – Tropical Depression Nineteen-E forms 500 miles (925 km) south-southwest of Acapulco, Mexico.

November 8
1200 UTC – Tropical Depression Nineteen-E strengthens into Tropical Storm Rick.

November 9
0600 UTC – Tropical Storm Rick strengthens into the ninth and final hurricane of the season.
1200 UTC – Hurricane Rick strengthens into a Category 2 hurricane.
1800 UTC – Hurricane Rick weakens into a Category 1 hurricane.

November 10
0100 UTC – Hurricane Rick makes landfall near Puerto Escondido, Mexico with winds of 85 mph (135 km/h).
1200 UTC – Hurricane Rick weakens into a tropical storm.
1800 UTC – Tropical Storm Rick weakens into a tropical depression.

November 11
0000 UTC – Tropical Depression Rick dissipates.

November 30
 The 1997 central and eastern Pacific hurricane seasons officially end.

December

December 2
1200 UTC – Tropical Depression Five-C forms out of season near the Line Islands.
1800 UTC – Tropical Depression Five-C strengthens into Tropical Storm Paka.

December 7
0000 UTC – Tropical Storm Paka crosses the International Date Line into the Western Pacific and the final advisory is issued, therefore ending the 1997 Pacific hurricane season.

See also

1997 Pacific typhoon season
Timeline of the 1997 Atlantic hurricane season

Notes

References

Pacific hurricane meteorological timelines
Articles which contain graphical timelines